On the Other Side of the Tracks is a French comedy film released in France on December 19, 2012, and picked up for US distribution by The Weinstein Company. It was released in the US on April 4, 2014. On the Other Side of the Tracks is the story of two very different police officers who team up after a business mogul's wife is murdered. A sequel titled The Takedown was released on May 6, 2022 on Netflix.

Plot 

When bad boy police officer Ousmane is involved in a car accident, he is mistaken for the assailant by his fellow police officers. The next day, the wife of a business mogul turns up nearby Ousmane's housing project. Ousmane draws connections between the two crimes and believes he is able to solve both crimes. In order to be heard by fellow police officers, Ousmane is forced to team up with visiting Parisian investigator Francois Monge, who has much more departmental clout. Despite coming from and working in very different neighborhoods, the pair find common ground through their policing style, including manhandling suspects and kicking butt.

Cast

Release 
The film was released in the United States on April 4, 2014, opening on 50 screens.

References

External links 
 
 
 
 
 
 

2012 films
2010s French-language films
French comedy films
2012 comedy films
Films scored by Ludovic Bource
2010s French films